Harbottle & Lewis is a law firm based in London, United Kingdom which advises clients across the media, communications and entertainment industries.

Harbottle & Lewis has 42 partners and 68 lawyers and in 2016/17 recorded turnover of £28.1m. It is recommended by the independent legal directories The Legal 500 and Chambers and Partners in all its core practice areas.

History 
Laurence Harbottle and Brian Lewis met at Law School in Guildford in 1951. Both lawyers had a special interest in the legal aspects of film production and theatre and in December 1955 established Harbottle & Lewis with its office in South Molton Street, Mayfair. While Brian Lewis concentrated on film guarantees and film productions, Laurence Harbottle mainly acted for film producers as well as writers, actors and technicians.

With advances in technology, their firm grew and developed its television and music industry expertise. More recently Harbottle & Lewis has also built specialist practice areas in electronic commerce and interactive entertainment.

The firm moved from South Molton Street to its current location on Hanover Square in May 1988.

Laurence Harbottle served as solicitor to friends Laurence Olivier and Dirk Bogarde. The firm's clients presently include The Prince of Wales, and The Duke of Cambridge.

Relations with News International

In 2006 Harbottle & Lewis acted on behalf of Prince Charles in engaging with the Metropolitan Police's investigations with regards to the hacking of the phones of his sons, Princes William and Harry, in the News of the World royal phone hacking scandal. That scandal subsequently led to the dismissal of News of the World reporter Clive Goodman. When Goodman sued for unfair dismissal, Harbottle & Lewis were hired by the News of the World's parent company, News International.

On 10 July 2011, Harbottle & Lewis acting for their client News International were cited by BBC News Business editor Robert Peston as being involved in the 'smoking gun' emails in the News of the World phone hacking scandal. On 18 July 2011, the firm issued an open letter outlining its position, and appointed Luther Pendragon to handle PR issues relating to the affair. On 19 July, Lord MacDonald the former Director of Public Prosecutions engaged by News Corporation to review the emails handed to Harbottle & Lewis in 2007, said in evidence to the Home Affairs Select Committee:

On 20 July, Harbottle & Lewis issued a statement saying that it had asked News International to release it from its professional duty of confidentiality, which had been declined by News International. Harbottle & Lewis subsequently wrote to John Whittingdale MP, chairman of the Culture, Media and Sport Committee, asking to provide evidence to the committee.

On 21 July it was reported that News International had authorised Harbottle & Lewis to answer questions from the Metropolitan Police Service and parliamentary select committees in respect of what they were asked to do.

The Culture, Media and Sports Committee is reported to be planning to write to Harbottle & Lewis asking its representatives to appear when it resumes in October.

Paul Farrelly, one of the MPs on the committee, said:

He said that a letter written by the London law firm in 2007 to News International concerning a review of internal News of the World emails was now "clearly misleading".

On 22 July, Tom Watson, another MP on the committee, published a letter from the Solicitors Regulation Authority in response to his letter expressing concerns about Harbottle and Lewis's part in the phone-hacking affair.  In the letter, Anthony Townsend, Chief Executive of the SRA said:

See also
 Metropolitan police role in phone hacking scandal
 News International phone hacking scandal
 Phone hacking scandal reference lists

References

External links 
 Harbottle & Lewis website

Law firms based in London
Intellectual property law firms
Law firms established in 1955
News International phone hacking scandal
British companies established in 1955